Abed Abest (born 1987, in Bandar Abbas, Iran), is an Iranian director, writer and actor. He played roles in Shahram Mokri's films Fish & Cat which Won the Horizon Prize in Venice Film Festival (2013)  and Invasion which was Nominated for Teddy Award in Berlin International Film Festival (2018). His first feature film was Simulation (2017), which world premiered in Berlin International Film Festival (2017) forum section  and Won the best film award in Spain moving images film festival (2018). His second feature film Killing the Eunuch Khan (2021) is premiered in the 25th edition of  Tallinn Black Nights Film Festival. and won the Grand Jury Prize in Breakouts Section at Slamdance Film Festival

Filmography

References

External links

1978 births
Living people
Iranian film directors
Iranian screenwriters
Iranian male actors